The Latin Grammy Award for Best Classical Album is an honor presented annually at the Latin Grammy Awards, a ceremony that recognizes excellence and promotes awareness of cultural diversity and the contributions of Latin musicians in the United States and worldwide. The award is given every year since the 1st Latin Grammy Awards ceremony, which took place at the Staples Center in Los Angeles.

The description of the category at the 2020 Latin Grammy Awards states that "it encompasses movements of works that include from opera to compositions for symphony orchestras, instrumental or vocal soloists, chamber ensembles, choral music, electroacoustic music, etc." and includes classical music albums "in which participants are predominantly Latino composers, directors or performers in any of its forms: composition, performance, direction."

Spanish singer and conductor Plácido Domingo is the most awarded artist in the category with four wins. He was also the first recipient of the award in 2000.

Winners and nominees

2000s

2010s

2020s

References

External links
Official site of the Latin Grammy Awards

Classical Album
Latin Grammy Awards for classical music